Bitare, sometimes known as Kitale is an administrative ward within Muhambwe Constituency in Kibondo District of Kigoma Region in Tanzania. In 2016 the Tanzania National Bureau of Statistics report there were 11,553 people in the ward, from 10,496 in 2012.

References

Kibondo District
Wards of Kigoma Region
Constituencies of Tanzania